Prešov District (okres Prešov) is a district in the Prešov Region of eastern Slovakia. 
Until 1918, the district was part of the county of Kingdom of Hungary of Šariš.

Municipalities

References 

Districts of Slovakia
Geography of Prešov Region